Moranbah Airport  is an airport serving Moranbah, Queensland, Australia.

The airport averages 40 QantasLink flights each week, most of these being Dash-8 Q400 aircraft. In July 2012, Virgin Australia commenced charter flight operations using Skywest ATR-72 aircraft. At one point, Virgin Australia Regional Airlines (VA) offered three daily return flights on weekdays and one on Sundays using ATR 72 aircraft, however with the withdrawal of their ATR aircraft from Queensland, the airline has now ceased operating into the airport.

In 2010, to accommodate the growth and demand for more flights, BMA provided $47 million in funding to upgrade the runway and build a new terminal. The new terminal was completed in June 2012 and now services approximately 160,000 public and charter passengers each year.

All private general aviation aircraft are required to contact BMA's Airports Team for slot times and permission to land at the aerodrome. 

Hertz, Budget and Avis car rental companies all operate from the terminal. Short-term car parking is free for the first hour and $2/hr after that, or $21/day. Long term car parking is $8/day for the first 14 days and $10/day thereafter.

BMA Coal Operations Pty Ltd is a jointly owned entity of BHP and Mitsubishi Development Pty Ltd.

Facilities

Airlines and destinations

See also
 List of airports in Queensland

References

Airports in Queensland
Buildings and structures in Central Queensland